The Belgian Permanent Representative to the United Nations is the senior member of Belgium's delegation to the United Nations, based in New York.

Permanent Representatives 

 1945–1946: Paul-Henri Spaak
 1946–1948: Fernand Dehousse
 ????
 1951–1952: Fernand Dehousse
 ????
 1955: Fernand Van Langenhove
 ????
 1959–1965: Walter Loridan
 1965–1969: Constant Schuurmans
 1972–1973: Edouard Longerstaey
 1974–1977: Patrick Nothomb
 1978–1981: Andre Ernemann
 1981–1988: Edmonde Dever
 ????
 1994–1998: Alexis Reyn
 1998–2001: André Adam
 2001–2004: Jean de Ruyt
 2004–2008: Johan Verbeke
 2008–2012: Jan Grauls
 2013–2016: Bénédicte Frankinet
 2016–2020: Marc Pecsteen de Buytswerve
 2020–: Philippe Kridelka

References 

Belgium
United Nations